James Jeffrey Roche (May 31, 1847April 3, 1908) was an Irish-American poet, journalist and diplomat. Roche emigrated as a young child, and grew up in Prince Edward Island, Canada.  He came to Boston in 1866, and joined the staff of the Irish newspaper. He became editor-in-chief in 1890, and was a leading spokesman for Catholic intellectuals in New England. When most Democrats in the region deserted William Jennings Bryan in 1896, Roche and the Boston Pilot gave Brian strong support. At the end of his life he was the American Consul in Switzerland.

Life and works
Through his father, Edward Roche, an able mathematician and scholar, who occupied the office of Provincial Librarian in Prince Edward Island, he inherited the literary quality dominant in his temperament and his art. The family settled in Prince Edward Island in the same year as his birth. The boy was educated by his father, and later in St. Dunstan's College. Here, at the age of fifteen, foreshadowing his career, he turned journalist and proudly edited the college weekly "unto the urn and ashes" of its infant end. His youth had a fair share of spirited adventure, an encountering of odd characters and scenes, a sharp observance of events, and a close, rapid, honest mental life.

In 1866 he went to Boston, became a businessman and prospered there, but later reverted to literature, his early love and first unconscious choice. In print he was noted for an absurd, unique humor. Already married, in 1883 he joined the staff of the Boston Boston Pilot as an assistant editor under John Boyle O'Reilly, and later became editor of the newspaper. At this time he wrote a History of the Filibusters in Spanish America, a novel, and a drama. In 1886, he published Songs and Satires.

Works
Songs and Satires (1887) Boston & Cambridge (USA)
Life of John Boyle O'Reilly (1891)
Ballads of Blue Water (1895) Boston
The Vase and Other Bric-a-brac (1900)
Her Majesty the King, A Romance of the Harem (1901)

Further reading
Mann, Arthur. Yankee reformers in the urban age: social reform in Boston, 1880-1900 (Harper & Row, 1954) pp 44–51

References

External links

 
 
 

1847 births
1908 deaths
Writers from Prince Edward Island
Irish emigrants to the United States (before 1923)
Irish poets
Writers from Boston
American male journalists
American diplomats
Saint Dunstan's University alumni
19th-century poets
Irish male poets
19th-century American male writers
People from Mountmellick
Burials at Holyhood Cemetery (Brookline)